This is a list of the main career statistics of Danish tennis player Caroline Wozniacki. She won 30 singles titles including a Grand Slam title, a WTA Finals title, three Premier Mandatory titles and three Premier 5 titles. She was the winner of the 2018 Australian Open and the 2017 WTA Finals, and the runner-up at the 2009 US Open, the 2010 WTA Tour Championships, and the 2014 US Open. She also reached another 25 singles finals, and won two doubles titles. Wozniacki was first ranked world No. 1 by the WTA on October 11, 2010.

Performance timelines
Only main-draw results in WTA Tour, Grand Slam tournaments, Fed Cup and Olympic Games are included in win–loss records.

Singles

Doubles

Team performance timeline
Levels of Fed Cup in which Denmark did not compete in a particular year are marked "Not Participating" or "NP".

Significant finals

Grand Slam finals

Singles: 3 (1 title, 2 runner-ups)

WTA Finals finals

Singles: 2 (1 title, 1 runner-up)

WTA Premier Mandatory & 5 finals

Singles: 12 (6 titles, 6 runner-ups)

WTA career finals

Singles: 55 (30 titles, 25 runner-ups)

Doubles: 4 (2 titles, 2 runners-up)

ITF Circuit finals

Singles: 6 (4 titles, 2 runner–ups)

Junior Grand Slam finals

Singles: 2 (1 title, 1 runner-up)

Fed Cup participation

Singles: 22 (17–5)

Doubles: 9 (3–6)

WTA Tour career earnings
Wozniacki earned more than 35 million dollars during her career.

Career Grand Slam statistics

Career Grand Slam seedings 
The tournaments won by Wozniacki are in boldface, and advanced into finals by Wozniacki are in italics.

Best Grand Slam tournament results details 
Grand Slam winners are in boldface, and runner–ups are in italics

Record against other players

Record against top 10 players
Wozniacki's record against players who have been ranked in the top 10. Active players are in boldface.

No. 1 wins

Double bagel matches

Top 10 wins per season

See also

 2018 Caroline Wozniacki tennis season
 List of career achievements by Caroline Wozniacki
 List of WTA number 1 ranked singles tennis players
 WTA Tour records

Notes

References

External links
 Official website
 
 Caroline Wozniacki at the International Tennis Federation
 Caroline Wozniacki at the Fed Cup
 Caroline Wozniacki on IMDb
 Caroline Wozniacki at the International Olympic Committee
 Caroline Wozniacki at Olympics at Sports-Reference.com

Caroline Wozniacki
Wozniacki, Caroline